The 1935 Southern Illinois Maroons football team was an American football team that represented Southern Illinois Normal University (now known as Southern Illinois University Carbondale) in the Illinois Intercollegiate Athletic Conference (IIAC) during the 1935 college football season.  In its 19th season under head coach William McAndrew, the team compiled a 1–7–1 record (1–4–1 against conference opponents) and finished in 15th place out of 20 teams in the IIAC.

Schedule

References

Southern Illinois
Southern Illinois Salukis football seasons
Southern Illinois Maroons football